Heugueville-sur-Sienne is a commune in the Manche department in northwestern France.

See also
Communes of the Manche department

References

Heuguevillesursienne